The Glorious Lady is a 1919 American silent drama film directed by George Irving. A copy of the film survives in the Nederlands Filmmuseum.

Cast
 Olive Thomas as Ivis Benson
 Matt Moore as The Duke of Loame
 Evelyn Brent as Lady Eileen
 Robert Taber as Dr. Neuman (*this Robert Taber is not the stage actor died 1904)
 Huntley Gordon as Lord Chettington
 Marie Burke as Dowager Duchess
 Mrs. Henry Clive as Hilda Neuman
 Mona Kingsley as Babette

References

External links

1919 films
1919 drama films
Silent American drama films
American silent feature films
American black-and-white films
Selznick Pictures films
Films directed by George Irving
1910s American films